Clwyd West may refer to:

 Clwyd West (UK Parliament constituency)
 Clwyd West (Senedd constituency)